Vasil Shandarov (born 14 July 1991) is a Bulgarian tennis player.

Shandarov has a career high ATP singles ranking of 1603 achieved on 22 June 2015. He also has a career high ATP doubles ranking of 1445 achieved on 11 December 2017.

Shandarov made his ATP main draw debut at the 2018 Sofia Open as an alternate in the doubles main draw partnering with his brother Radoslav Shandarov.

References

External links

1991 births
Living people
Bulgarian male tennis players
21st-century Bulgarian people